Miss Teen USA 1999, the 17th Miss Teen USA pageant, was televised live from Shreveport, Louisiana on 24 August 1999.  At the conclusion of the final competition, Ashley Coleman of Delaware was crowned by outgoing queen Vanessa Minnillo of South Carolina.

The pageant was hosted by newcomer Carson Daly with color commentary by Ali Landry and Julie Moran for the second year.  Landry held the Miss Louisiana Teen USA 1990, Miss Louisiana USA 1996 and Miss USA 1996 titles, making the semi-finals at Miss Teen USA 1990 pageant before winning Miss USA 1996.

During the pageant there were performances by Britney Spears and N'Sync.  This was the second year that N'Sync provided entertainment.

Results

Placements

Special awards
Miss Congeniality: Morgan Maholich (New York)
Miss Photogenic: Lexie Kemper (Kentucky)
Style Award: Morgan O'Murray (Colorado)
Best in Swimsuit: Ashley Coleman (Delaware)
Best in Evening Gown: Ashley Coleman (Delaware)

Historical significance
Ashley Coleman, the winner of Miss Teen USA 1999 was the first delegate from Delaware to win the national title.
This was Louisiana's highest placement, until Shelley Hennig won the Miss Teen USA 2004 pageant.
This was Maryland's highest placement, until (Kamie Crawford) won the Miss Teen USA 2010 pageant. 
Kentucky placed for the first time since 1995.
This was only Indiana and Michigan's second placement, coming after success in 1996.  Arizona and Michigan, both placing for the third time, also placed for the first time since 1996.
Virginia placed for the third consecutive year, the first time this had occurred.  This record was broken when Virginia placed consecutively from 2005 to 2008. Tori Hall placed in the top 10 at Miss Teen USA 2005. Samantha Casey placed 3rd runner up to Katie Blair of Montana. Emily Bruce continued these placements by placing in the top 10 at Miss Teen USA 2007. And finally, Megan Myrehn placed in the top 15 at Miss Teen USA 2008.

Final Competition Score 

 Winner
 First Runner-up
 Second Runner-up
 Top 5 Finalist
 Top 10 Semifinalist
(#) Rank in each round of competition

Delegates
The Miss Teen USA 1999 delegates were:

 Alabama - Starla Smith
 Alaska - Kjersti Marie Parker
 Arizona - Danielle Demski
 Arkansas - Sarah Moody
 California - Marianne Kennedy
 Colorado - Morgan O'Murray
 Connecticut - Bethany McGlynn
 Delaware - Ashley Coleman
 District of Columbia - Shelby Braxton-Brooks
 Florida - Michelle Schmotzer
 Georgia - Keely Wright
 Hawaii - Aureana Tseu
 Idaho - Kimberly Weible
 Illinois - Amber Dusak
 Indiana - Jennifer Philips
 Iowa - Teresa Moberg
 Kansas - Grace Shibley
 Kentucky - Lexie Kemper
 Louisiana - Sarah Thornhill
 Maine - Michelle Beaulieu
 Maryland - Khosi  Roy
 Massachusetts - Jill Lynne Donahue
 Michigan - Sara Marie Dusendang
 Minnesota -  Laura Beth Reier
 Mississippi - Allison Bloodworth
 Missouri - Andrea Camile Elliott
 Montana - Raylene Miller
 Nebraska - Kiley Kempcke
 Nevada - Kristen Walters
 New Hampshire - Kristen Thurston
 New Jersey - Nicole Marie Golas
 New Mexico - Alina Ogle
 New York -  Morgan Maholich
 North Carolina - Stephanie Holt
 North Dakota - Natalie Larson
 Ohio - Erika Moody
 Oklahoma - Ashley Bowen
 Oregon - Tracy Hackenmiller
 Pennsylvania - Christina Cindrich
 Rhode Island - Jodi Fournier
 South Carolina - Hannah Grooms
 South Dakota - Alexia Marie Bonte
 Tennessee - Rachel Boston
 Texas - Misty Giles
 Utah - Laurissa Solomon 
 Vermont - Jennifer Ripley
 Virginia - Kristi Lauren Glakas
 Washington - Dianna Carlson
 West Virginia - Carrie Anne Fleshman
 Wisconsin - Deanndra Diane Deblack
 Wyoming - Katie Rudoff

Contestant notes
Kristi Lauren Glakas is one of only six women to be a Triple Crown titleholder, having competed at Miss Teen USA, Miss USA, and Miss America.  After placing first runner-up for two consecutive years, Glakas won the Miss Virginia USA 2004 title and competed at Miss USA 2004.  She later won the Miss Virginia 2005 title, and placed third runner-up at Miss America 2006.
Morgan O'Murray of Colorado later won the Miss Colorado 2002 title and competed at Miss America.  She later made two attempts to win the Miss Colorado USA title (in 2004 and 2005). Had she won the title, she would have become one of only a few women to win the Triple Crown.
Others who later competed at Miss USA were:
Alina Ogle (New Mexico) - Miss New Mexico USA 2003 (top ten at Miss USA 2003)
Allison Bloodworth (Mississippi) - Miss Mississippi USA 2003
Jennifer Ripley (Vermont) - Miss Vermont USA 2003
Danielle Demski (Arizona) - Miss Arizona USA 2004 (top fifteen at Miss USA 2004)
Kimberly Weible (Idaho) - Miss Idaho USA 2004 (top ten at Miss USA 2004)
Katie Rudoff (Wyoming) - Miss Wyoming USA 2004 
 Aureana Tseu (Hawaii)- Miss Hawaii USA 2009

Khosi Roy (MD) and Keely Wright (GA) were originally the first runner up at their respective state pageants.  Jane Kim won the title of Miss Georgia Teen USA 1999, but was disqualified in after it was discovered she was not a US citizen, but had been born in South Korea.  Kristina Sisco was the original winner of the Maryland title, but resigned after gaining a part on the soap opera As the World Turns.
Misty Giles (TX) went on to appear on the 12th season of the CBS reality show Survivor, this time set in Panama.  She was the third contestant voted off.
Grace Shibley (KS) reportedly finished in 11th place.  Her Top 15 placement was confirmed by the VanBros website, the organization that hosts and sponsors the Miss Kansas Teen USA pageant.

Judges
Kimberly Kirberger
Eric Lively
Colin Mortensen
Dave Tomberlin
Tisha Venturini
Coolio
Spinderella
Jeanne Pyun

External links
Official website

1999
1999 beauty pageants
1999 in the United States
1999 in Louisiana
Youth in the United States